The Two of Us is a studio album by Ramsey Lewis and Nancy Wilson released in 1984 on Columbia Records. The album peaked at No. 5 on the Billboard Traditional Jazz Albums chart.

Track listing

Personnel
Lead vocals – Daryl Coley, Nancy Wilson
Backing vocals – Freida Woody, Josie James, Lynn Davis, Marcy Levy 
Bass – Freddie Washington, Stanley Clarke
Concert grand piano [Steinway Concert Grand] – Ramsey Lewis
Drums – John Robinson, Ricky Lawson 
Guitar – Paul Jackson Jr.
Keyboards – Don Freeman
Narrator – Celia Kitengeth 
Piano – Vassal Benford
Sitar – Stanley Clarke
Strings – Barbara Hunter, Bill Hughes, Bonnie Douglas, Brenton Banks, Catherine Gotthoffer, Christine Ermacoff, James Getzoff, Janet Lakatos, Karen Jones, Murray Adler, Norman Carr, Paul Shure, Roland Kato, Ronald Folsom 
Synthesizer – Robert Brookins, Rory Kaplan
String arrangements by George del Barrio
Engineer – Erik Zobler
Assistant engineers – Duncan Aldrich, Gary Wagner, Jeff Vaughn, Mitch Gibson, Paul Erikson
Executive producer – Dr. George Butler
Mastered by Bernie Grundman
Produced by Stanley Clarke
Remixed by Don Hahn

References

External links
 

1984 albums
Ramsey Lewis albums
Nancy Wilson (jazz singer) albums
Albums produced by Stanley Clarke
Columbia Records albums